Desmethylflunitrazepam (also known as norflunitrazepam, Ro05-4435 and fonazepam) is a benzodiazepine that is a metabolite of flunitrazepam and has been sold online as a designer drug. It has an IC50 value of 1.499 nM for the GABAA receptor.

See also 

 Nitrazolam
 Phenazepam
 List of benzodiazepine designer drugs

References 

Designer drugs
Fluoroarenes
GABAA receptor positive allosteric modulators
Glycine receptor antagonists
Lactams
Nitrobenzodiazepines